Colán (Kolán) is an extinct language of Peru.

References

Languages of Peru
Catacaoan languages